is a town located in Nagano Prefecture, Japan. , the town had an estimated population of 11,076 in 4330 households, and a population density of 59 persons per km².

Geography

Located in eastern Nagano prefecture, Sakuho stretches from west to east. It is situated in the Saku Basin, between the high peaks Mount Arafune and Mount Tateshina. The Shinano River flows through, and the mountainous parts of the town are located in the Yatsugatake-Chushin Kogen Quasi-National Park and the Myogi-Arafune-Saku Kogen Quasi-National Park.

Mountains: Mount Morai
Rivers: Chikuma River, Ōishi River, Nukui River
Lakes: Futago Pond, Shirakoma Pond

Surrounding municipalities
Nagano Prefecture
Chino
Saku
Kitaaiki
Koumi
Gunma Prefecture
Nanmoku
Ueno

Climate
The town has a climate characterized by hot and humid summers, and cold winters (Köppen climate classification Cfa).  The average annual temperature in Sakuho is 10.4 °C. The average annual rainfall is 1661 mm with September as the wettest month. The temperatures are highest on average in August, at around 23.4 °C, and lowest in January, at around -0.2 °C.

Demographics
Per Japanese census data, the population of Sakuho has declined gradually over the past 50 years.

History
The area of present-day Sakuho was part of ancient Shinano Province. The villages of Kaisei and Sakai were created with the establishment of the modern municipalities system on April 1, 1889, merging to form the  town of Sakuho on February 1, 1955. Sakuho was created by the merger of Saku and the village of Yachiho on March 20, 2005.

Education
Sakuho has one public elementary school and one public middle school operated by the city government. The town does not have a high school.

Transportation

Railway
 East Japan Railway Company - Koumi Line
 -  -  -

Highway

Local attractions
Togyū Okumura Memorial Museum

References

External links

Official Website 

 
Towns in Nagano Prefecture